In algebra, an augmentation of an associative algebra A over a commutative ring k is a k-algebra homomorphism , typically denoted by ε. An algebra together with an augmentation is called an augmented algebra. The kernel of the augmentation is a two-sided ideal called the augmentation ideal of A.

For example, if  is the group algebra of a finite group G, then

is an augmentation. 

If A is a graded algebra which is connected, i.e. , then the homomorphism  which maps an element to its homogeneous component of degree 0 is an augmentation. For example,

is an augmentation on the polynomial ring .

References
 

Algebras